Ian Bliss (born June 30, 1966) is an Australian film, television, and stage character actor. With a career that has spanned 30 years, he has appeared in numerous Australian television dramas including Heartbreak High, Wentworth, Underbelly and more.

Career 
Bliss starred in an episode of Halifax f.p. in 1996. Bliss is best known for his role as Bane and Agent Smith in The Matrix Reloaded and The Matrix Revolutions (2003), for which he was chosen by the Wachowskis because of his accurate impersonation of Hugo Weaving (Agent Smith's program form), and also his partial resemblance to Weaving.

After the Matrix sequels, Bliss took minor roles in the feature films Stealth and Superman Returns. He also played the Peacekeeper scientist Drillic in the Farscape episode "Losing Time". Bliss also appeared on the episode 8 of the 2010 HBO miniseries The Pacific as Capt. Le Francois and surf series The Reef. He has also appeared in several Australian television drama series including Heartbreak High, Underbelly, Blue Murder and Canal Road. Stage performances include the lead role in War Horse, in Sydney's Lyric Theatre.

Bliss would appear in Underbelly adaptation Informer 3838 as Commissioner Simon Overland, it would be Bliss' third appearance in the Underbelly universe also appearing in the original Underbelly as "Mr L" and in Fat Tony an Co.

In 2018 Bliss also appeared in season 6 of Wentworth playing Detective Collins, he reprised the role in the final series of Wentworth appearing in a total of 6 episodes.

Bliss is also a sought after voice over artist and has provided his voice to many animated series such as Big Words, Small Stories, Kuu Kuu Harajuku, Get Ave and SheZow and also gave his voice to the Bowel Cancer Australia campaigns that would go to air every year since 2018.

Bliss in 2022 joined the cast for SBS drama Safe Home (TV series). 

Bliss would also join the filming of Late Night With The Devil after a cast withdrawal.

Personal life 
Bliss graduated from Australia's National Institute of Dramatic Art.  Bliss also earned a Bachelor of Education while studying his acting degree at NIDA. Bliss is married to Jacquie Brennan, an actress. Bliss and Brennan met on the set of theatre play Silhouette at a cast barbeque where they grew a close bond as he would pick Brennan up for rehearsal. Brennan and Bliss married in 2001 and they have two children together.

Filmography

References

External links

 Ian Bliss at LMCM 
 Ian Bliss at RMK Management 
 Ian Bliss on Instagram 

Living people
Australian male television actors
Australian male film actors
1966 births